Brădeanu is a commune in Buzău County, Muntenia, Romania. It is composed of three villages: Brădeanu, Mitropolia and Smârdan.

The 22-hectare Brădeanu forest is the only pedunculate oak forest in Buzău County. It also features elms, wild pear trees and Tatar maples.

Notes

Communes in Buzău County
Localities in Muntenia